Alpine is an unincorporated community in Columbia Township, Fayette County, Indiana.

History
The first sawmill in Columbia Township was built at Alpine in 1814. Alpine was laid out as a town in about 1832.

By 1885, Alpine contained a sawmill, a gristmill, and a station on the Whitewater Valley Railroad.

A post office opened in Alpine in 1868, and remained in operation until it was discontinued in 1966.

Geography

References

Unincorporated communities in Fayette County, Indiana
Unincorporated communities in Indiana